Leah Marie Remini (born June 15, 1970) is an American actress. She starred as Carrie Heffernan on the CBS sitcom The King of Queens (1998–2007) and as Vanessa Celluci in the CBS sitcom Kevin Can Wait (2017–2018), both alongside Kevin James.

Remini coproduced and hosted the A&E documentary series Leah Remini: Scientology and the Aftermath (2016–2019), for which she won two Primetime Emmy Awards for Outstanding Hosted Nonfiction Series or Special. She also cohosted the daytime talk show The Talk (2010–2011). Remini's films include the comedy Old School (2003), the mystery comedy Handsome (2017), and the romantic comedy Second Act (2018).

After being a member of the Church of Scientology from childhood, Remini left the organization in 2013. Two years later, Remini released her book, Troublemaker: Surviving Hollywood and Scientology; the memoir became number one on the New York Times best-seller list. In 2016, she followed up with an Emmy Award-winning documentary television series on A&E, Leah Remini: Scientology and the Aftermath, where she created a platform for victims and survivors of Scientology.

Since July 2020, Remini has been the cohost of the podcast Scientology: Fair Game, alongside Mike Rinder.

Early life
Leah Marie Remini was born on June 15, 1970, in Brooklyn, New York City, to Vicki Marshall and George Remini, who owned an asbestos removal company. Her mother is of Austrian Jewish descent, while her father has Italian ancestry, rooted in Sicily. Remini was raised in Bensonhurst.

Remini was baptized Roman Catholic and raised in the Catholic faith during her early childhood. When Remini was eight years old, her mother joined the Church of Scientology, and Remini was thereafter raised as a Scientologist. At 13 years old, Remini and sister Nicole were taken to join Scientology's Paramilitary organization called the Sea Organization, where they were forced to sign billion-year contracts and work for their room and board. Sea Org children do not live with their parents, are treated as adults, and work around the clock. Remini's mother decided to take her children out of the Sea Org and return to civilian Scientology life within the same year. Remini moved to Los Angeles, California, with her mother and sisters, where she spent the remainder of her teenage years working to pay off their debt to Scientology. This debt, known as a Freeloader Debt or Freeloader Bill, is a retroactive billing for any auditing received or any Scientology training received while in the Sea Org, and can run into tens of thousands or even hundreds of thousands of dollars. In addition, Remini and her family worked regular jobs to pay for continuing Scientology courses and services.

Career

Film and television
One of Remini's early television roles was on Who's the Boss? as Charlie Briscoe, which led to a spin-off series entitled Living Dolls, in which Remini starred with Halle Berry. The show premiered in late 1989 and ran for twelve episodes.

In 1991, Remini had a supporting role as Tina Bovasso on ABC's sitcom The Man in the Family. She then had recurring roles on Saved by the Bell playing Stacey Carosi, and on Evening Shade as Taylor Newton's (Jay R. Ferguson) girlfriend, Daisy. Remini then appeared in two more short-lived series, First Time Out (1995) and Fired Up (1997–98). In 1991 and 1993, she appeared on Cheers as Serafina, the daughter of Carla and Nick Tortelli (Rhea Perlman and Dan Hedaya). In 1994, Remini auditioned for the role of Monica Geller on Friends, but the role went to Courteney Cox. Remini later appeared in the 1995 Friends episode "The One with the Birth" in which she played a pregnant woman, Lydia, whose delivery is aided by Joey. 

In 1998, Remini landed the role of Carrie Heffernan on the CBS sitcom The King of Queens. The series was successful, and ran for nine seasons from September 21, 1998, to May 14, 2007. During her time on the show, she starred in Quaker State's television commercials in 2000 and 2001. 

Remini had a supporting role in the comedy film Old School (2003). She also starred in her own reality show, Inside Out: Leah Remini, which was a documentary that aired on VH1 about Remini's wedding. Following the success of the wedding special, VH1 documented the next phase of their lives with the birth of her daughter Sofia Bella. Remini has starred in nine-episode webisodes of In the Motherhood, along with Chelsea Handler and Jenny McCarthy, and made two guest appearances on Handler's talk show Chelsea Lately. 

On December 15, 2009, Remini appeared as Carrie Heffernan on Lopez Tonight with George Lopez in an episode reuniting the cast of the George Lopez sitcom. Remini and Holly Robinson Peete appeared on The Young and the Restless on July 28, 2011.

In October 2011, Remini signed a talent development deal at ABC and ABC Studios that required the network and the studio to develop a comedy project for Remini to star in and produce. 

Remini competed on season 17 of Dancing with the Stars, in which she was partnered with professional dancer Tony Dovolani. The couple made it to the tenth week of competition and reached fifth place. Remini later returned in season 19 as a guest co-host on week six. She returned as guest co-host on season 21 during weeks six and seven.

In 2013, Remini joined the cast of the TV Land comedy The Exes, filling a recurring role starting in season three. Remini created, produced and starred in a reality television series titled Leah Remini: It's All Relative. The show focuses on Remini's family life. It premiered on TLC on July 10, 2014.

In early 2017, Remini returned to acting and was announced as one of the leads in NBC's sitcom What About Barb?, a gender-swapped version of the 1991 Frank Oz comedy What About Bob?. She portrayed Suzanne, a renowned psychotherapist and best-selling author. Ultimately, NBC passed on the project and it wasn't picked up to series. In March 2017, it was announced Remini would reunite with Kevin James on the season finale of Kevin Can Wait. In June 2017, it was announced Remini was upped to a series regular beginning with season two. In May 2018, the series was cancelled by the network after two seasons. In 2017, Remini co-starred in the comedy films Mad Families, The Clapper, and Handsome. In 2018, she starred as Joan, opposite Jennifer Lopez, in the romantic comedy film Second Act.

In 2020 Remini & her production company, No, Seriously Productions signed a production deal with Critical Content. In June 2022, Remini was named a judge on the seventeenth season of Fox's dance competition series So You Think You Can Dance, replacing Matthew Morrison.

Remini began 2021 as the host of the Game Show Network original series People Puzzler.

The Talk 
Remini was a co-host in the first season of the CBS daytime talk show, The Talk, which premiered October 18, 2010. The other co-hosts were Julie Chen, Sara Gilbert, Holly Robinson Peete, and Sharon Osbourne. The show, similar to The View, seeks to address motherhood and contemporary issues. In March 2012, a heavily publicized Twitter dispute ignited between Remini and Osbourne when Remini fired back at Osbourne, Osbourne making criticisms of Remini and Holly Robinson Peete on The Howard Stern Show in relation to their contracts not being renewed for The Talk. In response to questions from her Twitter followers, Remini tweeted:

In response, Osbourne tweeted, "I had absolutely nothing to do with her departure from the show and have no idea why she continues to take to Twitter to spread this false gossip." Remini tweeted a challenge to Osbourne to establish in a court of law what statements she (Remini) had made that were untrue. 

Friction in relation to these matters resurfaced in the media in early 2021 when Osbourne was embroiled in a scandal over her remarks made on The Talk to Sheryl Underwood and ultimately terminated from the program over them. Both Peete and Remini took to social media to reproach Osbourne over her conduct in relation to the scandal, pointing out that they had been treated similarly by her, charging Osbourne with additional discriminatory behaviors as well. Osbourne responded with threats of defamation lawsuits against Peete and Remini, but ultimately did nothing.

Personal life
Remini met actor Angelo Pagán at a Cuban restaurant in 1996. He has three sons from previous relationships. They were married on July 19, 2003. Their daughter was born on June 16, 2004, one day after Remini's 34th birthday. Remini and husband Angelo baptized their daughter Sofia as a Catholic.

Scientology
Remini was a member of the Church of Scientology from the age of nine.

In July 2013, Remini left Scientology, owing to policies that forbid members from questioning the management of Church leader David Miscavige, which she believed was corrupt; the reported abuse of members of its Sea Org religious order; its policy of "disconnection"; and its practice of branding those who have left the Church of their own accord as "Suppressive Persons" and the Fair Gaming tactics that Scientology has used for decades.

According to former high-ranking Sea Org member Mike Rinder, Remini's problems with Scientology began when she asked about the whereabouts of Miscavige's wife Shelly at the 2006 wedding of Tom Cruise and Katie Holmes, and was told by then-spokesman Tommy Davis that she did not "have the fucking rank" to do so. Remini then filed a "knowledge report" in which she asserted that Miscavige, Cruise, and other senior Scientology members engaged in behavior that was inconsistent with Church rules. She was subsequently "subjected to years of 'interrogations' and 'thought modification'" that led to her being blackballed within Scientology. Fellow parishioners with whom Remini had been friends for decades wrote internal reports about her, resulting in a Church investigation into her family.

During a September 9, 2013, appearance on The Ellen DeGeneres Show, Remini discussed her departure from Scientology and the loss of friends who are still in the Church who, according to Remini, are not permitted to have contact with her. Following her departure from Scientology, she publicly expressed her appreciation for those who supported her departure. Remini's sister Nicole, who had earlier left Scientology herself, revealed that the rest of their family left the Church along with Remini to avoid being split up by the disconnection policy. Writer and director Paul Haggis, who had previously been the most famous person to publicly disavow Scientology, wrote an open letter, published by The Hollywood Reporter, thanking Remini for standing by him after he left Scientology and praised her "enormous amount of integrity and compassion".

In August 2013, it was disclosed that Remini had filed a missing person report with the Los Angeles Police Department (LAPD) concerning Shelly Miscavige, the wife of Scientology leader David Miscavige, who has not been seen in public since 2007. After the report was filed, the LAPD looked into the matter, met and spoke with Shelly before closing the investigation, and stated Remini's report was "unfounded". Scientology said in a statement that the whole affair was simply harassment and a publicity stunt for Remini.

In October 2013, it was reported that Remini had been subpoenaed to testify in a lawsuit in Comal County, Texas, against Scientology and David Miscavige, regarding acts of alleged harassment and surveillance against Monique Rathbun, who was married to ex-Scientology executive Mark Rathbun. Monique Rathbun's attorney, Ray Jeffery, said he wanted Remini, a former Scientologist, to give a deposition in the hopes she could testify that Miscavige has vast influence over the operations of the Church and had to have known about the alleged harassment.

Remini released her memoir Troublemaker: Surviving Hollywood and Scientology on November 3, 2015. In a 2015 interview with People magazine, Remini stated that she was embracing Catholicism and found comfort in the religion's practices, contrasting her experiences with Scientology. Remini developed a series for A&E focusing on ex-Scientologists speaking about their experiences, entitled Leah Remini: Scientology and the Aftermath. The show premiered November 29, 2016. In a statement released by the network, Remini said:

The documentary series received many awards in its three seasons: two Emmys, Reality Television Awards 2017 for hosting, 2018 NATPE Unscripted Breakthrough Awards for Best Innovation, 2019 Truth to Power Award, CHILD USA 2019 Barbara Blaine Trailblazer Award, and two Gracie Awards presented by the Alliance for Women in Media Foundation (for On-Air Talent - Lifestyle and Entertainment and for Non-Fiction Entertainment).

Catholicism
In 2015, Remini was interviewed by People, and her return to the Catholic Church following her departure from Scientology was discussed at length.

Education 
In May 2021, Remini was accepted into an associate degree program in liberal arts at New York University.

Filmography

Film

Television

Video games

Bibliography

Awards and nominations

References

Notes

Sources

External links

Leah Remini at the British Film Institute 

1970 births
20th-century American actresses
21st-century American actresses
Actresses from New York City
American film actresses
American game show hosts
American people of Austrian-Jewish descent
American people of Italian descent
People of Sicilian descent
American television actresses
American television talk show hosts
American voice actresses
American whistleblowers
American women podcasters
American podcasters
Catholics from New York (state)
Converts to Roman Catholicism from Scientology
Critics of Scientology
American former Scientologists
Living people
Participants in American reality television series
People from Bensonhurst, Brooklyn
Primetime Emmy Award winners